Barilius infrafasciatus is a fish in genus Barilius of the family Cyprinidae.

References

Fish of Thailand
infrafasciatus
Fish described in 1934